"Operation Righteous Cowboy Lightning" is the twelfth episode of the fifth season of the American television comedy series 30 Rock. It was written by executive producer Robert Carlock. The director of this episode was Beth McCarthy-Miller. It originally aired on NBC in the United States on January 27, 2011. Guest stars in this episode include Robert De Niro, Lester Holt, Sherri Shepherd, and Dean Winters.

In the episode, Jack Donaghy (Alec Baldwin) decides to pre-tape a celebrity benefit for a natural disaster, but his plan goes terribly wrong. Meanwhile, Tracy Jordan (Tracy Morgan) continues to drive Liz Lemon (Tina Fey) crazy with his irresponsibility. However, when a reality show camera crew starts to follow Tracy around, Liz tries to use it to her advantage.

"Operation Righteous Cowboy Lightning" was universally well received and praised by television critics. According to Nielsen Media Research, the episode was watched by 4.922 million households during its original broadcast, and received a 2.4 rating/7 share among viewers in the 18–49 demographic.

Plot
As it dawns on Jack Donaghy (Alec Baldwin) that he's no longer a part of GE and now works for Kabletown, he decides to conquer this new phase in his life just as he did before. After researching, he finds that the most watched reality programs of the past five years are celebrity benefits for natural disasters. Since all the networks air benefits at the same time, no one network has an advantage nor dominates in the ratings. To combat this, Jack decides to pre-tape a benefit to air on the night of the next natural disaster. When a disaster devastates an island called Mago, Jack is ecstatic until he finds out that the island is owned by the infamous troubled actor, Mel Gibson. Regardless, the event is a success.

Meanwhile, Tracy Jordan (Tracy Morgan) pushes Liz Lemon's (Tina Fey) buttons as usual by not showing up to rehearsals and leaving work to do something insane. However, Tracy's demeanor instantly changes when a camera crew starts to follow him around for his wife's new reality show. He starts to act responsible and respectful in front of the cameras, as he wants to avoid ruining his chances of winning an Oscar. Liz has the idea to use Tracy's fake good behavior to get him to do things he blew off in the past, knowing that he can't refuse while taped. This works until Tracy finds a loophole. When Liz tries to get Tracy to do more things, he refuses and insults Liz to the melody of "Uptown Girl" by Billy Joel. Since the song is copyrighted, any footage containing that song can't be used. Therefore, Tracy's irresponsibility wouldn't be aired on the show. Liz tries to outcrazy him with autotune, but she later realizes that she can't match his insanity. They finally talk it out alone and each argues that the other person would have been a failure without their help. Nevertheless, cameras manage to film this and Tracy and Liz refuse to make up. However, when the show edits their various confrontations and uses two look-alikes to create a make up scene along to the song "Secrets" by OneRepublic, both Liz and Tracy are moved to tears and make up for real.

Cultural references
This episode continues to depict the acquisition of NBC by Comcast. Liz tries to tell Jack what a Snart is (which is to sneeze and fart simultaneously) because it is ten o'clock. This refers 30 Rocks move from the 8:30 pm to the 10:00 pm timeslot. Tracy plans to get an island like Nicolas Cage, Celine Dion, and Charles Widmore, the latter being a fictional character from Lost. The whole cast of TGS is being filmed by the cameras of Angie Jordan's (wife of Tracy) new reality show, Queen of Jordan, which Jack commissioned in the previous episode, "Mrs. Donaghy". Eventually, an episode of 30 Rock was filmed as an episode of "Queen of Jordan".

The episode references the ongoing storyline of Liz's desire to become a mother when Kenneth gives Liz a memo he could not put in her mailbox because it was full of unread adoption materials. This story first began in the show's first season and continued in the third season.

Tracy and Liz fight in several ways, all of them involving masking their arguments in ways that cannot be used in the reality show for copyright reasons, such as singing along with the Billy Joel song "Uptown Girl" or wearing a New York Rangers goalie mask.

Jack films a pre-taped disaster event special, which he uses when a hurricane strikes Mago Island. This backfires because there were only two victims. The victims were the island's owner, actor Mel Gibson, who was highly publicized for his personal troubles, and his guest, Jon Gosselin.

While considering his new position as a Kabletown executive, Jack mentions "stout Cortez" and quotes the poem "On First Looking into Chapman's Homer" by John Keats. Tracy later also mentions feeling like "Stout Cortez," but this time in reference to his gardener.

Reception
According to Nielsen Media Research, "Operation Righteous Cowboy Lightning" was watched by 4.922million households in its original American broadcast. It earned a 2.4 rating/7 share in the 18–49 demographic. This means that it was seen by 2.4 percent of all 18- to 49-year-olds, and 7 percent of all 18- to 49-year-olds watching television at the time of the broadcast. This was a decrease from the previous episode, "Mrs. Donaghy", which was watched by 5.338 million American viewers. It turned out to be the most-watched episode of the show until the series finale on January 31, 2013.

References

External links
 

2011 American television episodes
30 Rock (season 5) episodes
Television shows directed by Beth McCarthy-Miller